Francisco Ballesteros (1770 in Zaragoza – 29 June 1832 in Paris) emerged as a career Spanish general during the Peninsular War.

Ballasteros served against the First French Republic in the 1793 War of the Pyrenees. He was dismissed from his post for lack of service in 1804 until Prime Minister Godoy rehabilitated him and assigned him to customs in Asturias.

Following the French invasion of 1808, Ballasteros took command of a regiment from the Junta General del Principado de Asturias and attached himself to the Army of Galicia under Blake and Castaños. After Napoleon's defeat of the Spanish popular armies and the subsequent French invasion of Andalusia, Ballasteros carried on operations against Marshal Soult in the south of Spain. With Blake and Zayas, he commanded the Spanish divisions that resisted every blow at the Battle of Albuera. His forces liberated Málaga in August 1812.

On 12 October 1812, unwilling to accept a foreigner (Wellington) as supreme commander of the Spanish Army, Ballasteros mutinied and was imprisoned in Ceuta, on the North African coast.

Liberal Revolution 

When the liberal revolution broke out in 1820, he was called back to Madrid, where on 7 March he surrounded the royal palace and forced King Ferdinand VII of Spain to sign the Spanish Constitution of 1812. He became vice-president of the junta provisional, closing many prisons of the Holy Inquisition and restoring municipal rights.

On 7 July 1822 Ballesteros defeated the Royal Guards, preventing a coup against the Constitution. For this he was named Captain General of Madrid. In 1823 he fought the French invasion under Louis-Antoine, Duke of Angoulême in Navarra and Aragón, but he had to capitulate on 21 August 1823 in Caporla.

On 1 October 1823 Fernando VII started his campaign of repression against all who had supported the constitutional government. Ballesteros fled to Cádiz, where he embarked on a British ship for France. He spent the rest of his life in Paris, where he died on 29 June 1832.

Notes

References
Longford, Elizabeth. Wellington: The Years of The Sword. New York: Harper and Row Publishers, 1969.

People from Zaragoza
Spanish generals
Spanish commanders of the Napoleonic Wars
1770 births
1832 deaths
Burials at Père Lachaise Cemetery